Prankers Pond (also Lily Pond or Pranker Pond) is one of the largest lakes in Saugus, Massachusetts, United States. It is the center of a recreational area that also includes hiking and picnicking areas. The pond lies east of U.S. Route 1 and southwest of Birch Pond.

References

Lakes of Massachusetts
Lakes of Essex County, Massachusetts
Saugus, Massachusetts